Kontula may refer to:

Place
Kontula, Helsinki
Kontula metro station

Surname
Anna Kontula (born 1977), Finnish sociologist
Osmo Kontula (born 1951), Finnish sociologist and sexologist
Pentti Kontula (1930–1987), Finnish Boxer

See also
 Kotula, a surname

Finnish-language surnames